Disowning Pain Phenomenon (or "Inverted binocular phenomena") is the subject of a 2008 study which suggested that distorting the body image can change the way we sense how it feels. For example, when we see an organ through inverted binoculars it looks smaller than it really is, which may reduce the pain felt from that organ.

Ten patients whose right arms were suffering from chronic pain that was intensified by movement were asked to move their arms while their visual perceptions of those arms were altered. They first used binoculars that magnified how their bodies appeared, and then used inverted binoculars that instead reduced the size of the image. Also, they were asked to rate the pain they felt while viewing the image. The larger the limbs appeared, the more pain was felt. Magnifying and minimizing with binoculars can even change the extent of swelling.

Notes 

Body shape
Pain management